Raimondo is an Italian given name. Its English equivalent is Raymond. Notable people with the name include:
Raimondo Boucheron (1800–1876), Italian composer, chiefly of sacred music
Raimondo D'Inzeo (1925–2013), Italian show jumping rider
Raimondo del Balzo Orsini (died 1406), nobleman of the Kingdom of Naples
Raimondo delle Vigne (1330–1399), leading member of the Dominican Order
Raimondo di Sangro (1710–1771), Italian nobleman, inventor, soldier, writer and scientist
Raimondo Epifanio (1440–1482), Italian painter of the Renaissance period
Raimondo Feletti (1887–1927), Italian physician and zoologist
Raimondo Franchetti has been the name of more than one Italian baron
Raimondo Guarini (1765–1852), Italian archaeologist, epigrapher, poet, college president, and teacher
Raimondo Manzini (1668–1744), Italian painter
Raimondo Manzini (1901–1988), Catholic journalist, Christian Democratic member of Italy's Parliament
Raimondo Montecuccoli (1608–1680), Italian military general, prince of the Holy Roman Empire and Neapolitan duke of Melfi
Raimondo Ponte (born 1955), former Swiss-Italian footballer
Raimondo Prinoth, Italian luger who competed during the 1960s
Raimondo Spiazzi (1918–2004), Italian Catholic theologian, advisor to Pius XII, and Mariologist
Raimondo Tommaso D'Aronco (1857–1932), Italian architect
Raimondo Viale Don Raimondo Viale (1907–1984), Italian Catholic priest
Raimondo Vianello (1922–2010), Italian film actor, comedian, and television host

See also
Raimondo (surname)
Appignano (Castiglione Messer Raimondo), frazione in the Province of Teramo in the Abruzzo region of Italy
Castiglione Messer Raimondo, town and comune in Teramo province in the Abruzzo region of eastern Italy
Civitella Messer Raimondo, comune and town in the Province of Chieti in the Abruzzo region of Italy
Italian cruiser Raimondo Montecuccoli, Condottieri class light cruiser serving with the Italian Regia Marina during World War II
San Raimondo, Siena, church in Siena, Tuscany, Italy

Italian-language surnames
Italian masculine given names
Italian names of Germanic origin